The Goldwyn Follies is a 1938 Technicolor film written by Ben Hecht, Sid Kuller, Sam Perrin and Arthur Phillips, with music by George Gershwin, Vernon Duke, and Ray Golden, and lyrics by Ira Gershwin and Sid Kuller. Some sources credit Kurt Weill as one of the composers, but this is apparently incorrect. The Goldwyn Follies was the first Technicolor film produced by Samuel Goldwyn.

The movie, which features Adolphe Menjou, Vera Zorina, Edgar Bergen (with Charlie McCarthy), Andrea Leeds, Kenny Baker, Ella Logan, Helen Jepson, Bobby Clark and the Ritz Brothers, depicts a movie producer who chooses a simple girl to be "Miss Humanity" and to critically evaluate his movies from the point of view of the ordinary person. The style of the film is very similar to other musicals of its era, including the "Gold Diggers" series and others. The film is an effective satire on Hollywood and has some excellent numbers choreographed by George Balanchine.

This was the last film score written by George Gershwin before his death on 11 July 1937. The Goldwyn Follies was released on 20 February 1938. The movie was nominated for an Oscar for Best Score as orchestrated by Edward B. Powell under the musical direction of Alfred Newman, as well as Best Interior Decoration.

Plot

Cast
Adolphe Menjou as Oliver Merlin (as Adolph Menjou)
The Ritz Brothers as Themselves
Vera Zorina as Olga Samara
Kenny Baker as Danny Beecher
Andrea Leeds as Hazel Dawes
Edgar Bergen as Himself
Charlie McCarthy as Himself
Helen Jepson as Leona Jerome
Phil Baker as Michael Day
Bobby Clark as A. Basil Crane Jr.
Ella Logan as Glory Wood
Jerome Cowan as Director Lawrence
Charles Kullmann as Alfredo in 'La Traviata'
The American Ballet of the Metropolitan Opera as Ballet Dancers
Nydia Westman as Ada
Alan Ladd as First Auditioning Singer (uncredited)
Francis Xavier Shields Assistant Director (uncredited)

Soundtrack
Songs include:
 "Love is Here to Stay"
 "I Was Doing All Right"
 "Spring Again"
 "Love Walked In"
 "I Love to Rhyme"
 "Where's The Gosh-Darn Cat?"

Reception
The film was nominated for the American Film Institute's 2006 list AFI's Greatest Movie Musicals.

However, the film was included in the 1978 book, The Fifty Worst Films of All Time (and How They Got That Way), by Harry Medved, Randy Dreyfuss, and Michael Medved.

References

https://web.archive.org/web/20050208123500/http://musicalheaven.com/g/goldwyn_follies.shtml
Harry Medved, Randy Dreyfuss, and Michael Medved, The Fifty Worst Films of All Time (1978)
Green, Stanley (1999) Hollywood Musicals Year by Year (2nd ed.), pub. Hal Leonard Corporation  page 79

External links

1938 films
1930s color films
Films directed by George Marshall
Samuel Goldwyn Productions films
1938 musical films
George Gershwin in film
Films with screenplays by Ben Hecht
American musical films
1930s American films